William Bowes was a Scottish professional footballer who played as an inside forward.

References

Footballers from West Lothian
Scottish footballers
Association football inside forwards
Burnley F.C. players
English Football League players
Year of birth missing
Year of death missing
People from Armadale, West Lothian